Xanthodaphne pastorinoi is a species of sea snail, a marine gastropod mollusk in the family Raphitomidae.

Description

Distribution
This marine species was found off the South Sandwich Islands .

References

External links
 Kantor Y.I., Harasewych M.G. & Puillandre N. (2016). A critical review of Antarctic Conoidea (Neogastropoda). Molluscan Research. 36(3): 153-206

pastorinoi
Gastropods described in 2016